The 1986 Shell Gemini 1000 km Brands Hatch was the fifth round of the 1986 World Sports-Prototype Championship, although it did not count towards the Teams' Championship.  It took place at Brands Hatch, Great Britain on 20 July 1986.

Official results
Class winners in bold.  Cars failing to complete 75% of the winner's distance marked as Not Classified (NC).

Statistics
 Pole Position - #7 Joest Racing - 1:16.270
 Fastest Lap - #14 Liqui Moly Equipe - 1:18.680
 Average Speed - 168.371 km/h

References

 
 

Brands Hatch
Brands Hatch
Brands Hatch